André Picard (born 23 January 1951) is a French lightweight rower. He won a gold medal at the 1975 World Rowing Championships in Nottingham with the lightweight men's four.

References

1951 births
Living people
French male rowers
World Rowing Championships medalists for France